is a district of Ōta, Tokyo, Japan. As of December 1, 2015, the population in the district is 23,004.

Facilities

References

Districts of Ōta, Tokyo